The 71st Regiment Illinois Volunteer Infantry was an infantry regiment that served in the Union Army during the American Civil War.

Service
The 71st  Illinois Infantry was organized at Camp Douglas at Chicago, Illinois and mustered into Federal service on July 26, 1862, for a term of three months.  It served garrisons in scattered garrisons in southern Illinois and western Kentucky. Company K unanimously elected James Creed as captain, which was responsible for protecting two bridges along the Big Muddy river in southern Illinois from Confederate sympathizers.

The regiment was mustered out on October 29, 1862.

Total strength and casualties
The regiment suffered 23 enlisted men who died of disease, for a total of 23 fatalities.

Commanders
Colonel Othniel Gilbert - mustered out with the regiment.

See also
List of Illinois Civil War Units
Illinois in the American Civil War

Notes

References
The Civil War Archive

Units and formations of the Union Army from Illinois
1862 establishments in Illinois
Military units and formations established in 1862
Military units and formations disestablished in 1862